Ode Fulutudilu (born 6 February 1990) is a soccer player who plays as a forward for Spanish club Real Betis and the South Africa women's national team. She has previously played for clubs in South Africa, Finland, Spain, Scotland, and France. She made her debut for South Africa in 2014 and was a member of their 2019 FIFA Women's World Cup squad. Born in the Democratic Republic of Congo, she and her family initially arrived in South Africa as refugees.

Early life 
Ode Fulutudilu was born in Kinshasa, Democratic Republic of Congo, on 6 February 1990. When she was three years old, her family left the country due to unrest and went to neighbouring Angola as refugees, before moving on to Cape Town in South Africa the following year. Fulutudilu's father was unable to find work in South Africa and eventually returned to Angola, but left her behind as he felt she would have a better future there. She subsequently grew up in a children's home. Having become interested in football when she watched the South Africa men's national team playing in the 1998 World Cup, she joined her first organised girls' team. Through this she met a British volunteer (Joelle Holland) who subsequently became her foster mother, and was instrumental in her getting a scholarship to study in the United States at Lee University in Cleveland, Tennessee.

College career
Fulutudilu spent four years playing college soccer for the Lee Flames, the athletic team of Lee University, winning three regular season titles and two national titles.

Club career 
When she signed with Málaga in 2019, she became the first South African to play in the top tier of Spanish women's football.

In January 2021, she left Finland to sign with Glasgow City in Scotland, joining fellow South African Janine van Wyk. However, due to COVID-19-related limits on football, she was not able to make her debut for the team until April. She would score hat-tricks in both her debut and second matches for Glasgow.

In February 2023, Fulutudilu returned to Spain, joining Liga F club Real Betis.

International career 
She played for the Banyana Banyana at the 2014 African Women's Championship She also represented South Africa at the 2019 World Cup, the country's first appearance in the tournament finals.

Personal life 
Fulutudilu has a bachelor's degree in sociology from Lee University.

References

External links

1990 births
Living people
Footballers from Kinshasa
Democratic Republic of the Congo refugees
Democratic Republic of the Congo emigrants to South Africa
Naturalised citizens of South Africa
Democratic Republic of the Congo women's footballers
South African women's soccer players
Women's association football forwards
Lee Flames women's soccer players
Kansallinen Liiga players
Málaga CF Femenino players
South Africa women's international soccer players
2019 FIFA Women's World Cup players
Democratic Republic of the Congo expatriate footballers
South African expatriate soccer players
Democratic Republic of the Congo expatriates in the United States
South African expatriate sportspeople in the United States
Expatriate women's soccer players in the United States
Expatriate women's footballers in Finland
Democratic Republic of the Congo expatriate sportspeople in Spain
Expatriate women's footballers in Spain
Glasgow City F.C. players
FC Fleury 91 (women) players
Real Betis Féminas players
Scottish Women's Premier League players
College women's soccer players in the United States
Expatriate women's footballers in Scotland
South African expatriate sportspeople in Scotland